JYP-Akatemia was a Finnish professional ice hockey team based in Jyväskylä. The club played in the Mestis from 2008 to 2017, after acquiring the spot from D-Kiekko. During their inaugural season, JYP-Akatemia was known as D Team. It was renamed JYP-Akatemia in 2011; in order to highlight the club's cooperation with its parent club.

JYP-Akatemia dissolved and ceased all operations in the summer of 2017, motivated by problems with finances and the wishes of the affiliate.

Season by season record

Notable players 
 Yohann Auvitu
 Riku Helenius
 Olli Määttä
 Harri Pesonen
 Tuomas Pihlman
 Sami Vatanen

References 

Mestis teams
Sport in Jyväskylä
2008 establishments in Finland
Defunct ice hockey teams in Europe